Herbert Larry Burgess (25 February 1883 – 1954) was an English footballer.

Born in Openshaw, Manchester, Burgess began his football career with Glossop North End, but soon signed for Manchester City. He made his debut for City on 5 September 1903, playing at left back away to Stoke City on the opening day of the 1903–04 season. In 1906, in the wake of a scandal regarding players' wages, Manchester City were forced into selling most of their players, and Burgess was purchased by Manchester United along with Sandy Turnbull, Jimmy Bannister and Billy Meredith. After helping the club to the 1907–08 Football League title, Burgess left the club and moved to Denmark to play for Kristiania. He then emigrated to Hungary, where he played for MTK Budapest, before becoming their manager. In the 1920s, Burgess' managerial career took him to Italy, where he became the manager of Padova. He had a two-year spell at Milan before returning to Padova, but two years later he was on the move again, this time to Roma.

Burgess was capped four times for England.

References

External links

1883 births
1954 deaths
Footballers from Manchester
English footballers
England international footballers
Manchester City F.C. players
Manchester United F.C. players
MTK Budapest FC players
English football managers
MTK Budapest FC managers
Calcio Padova managers
A.C. Milan managers
A.S. Roma managers
Expatriate football managers in Italy
English expatriate football managers
English Football League representative players
Association football fullbacks
Glossop North End A.F.C. players
English Football League players
FA Cup Final players